De Boezemvriend  (The Bosom Friend) is a 1982 Dutch film directed by Dimitri Frenkel Frank. It is loosely based on Nikolai Gogol's play, The Government Inspector. Comedian André van Duin plays the role of a charlatan-dentist Fred van der Zee (Professor Pas-du-Pain) who's mistaken for Napoleon's delegate.

Plot
A quack dentist is mistaken by a corrupt Dutch Colonel for one of Napoleons Inspector Generals during Napoleons occupation in 1811. What follows is a hilarious feast of similar misunderstandings and is only meant for those with a good sense of humor.

Cast
 André van Duin - Fred van der Zee
 Leen Jongewaard - Colonel Moeskop
 Geert de Jong - The Colonel's wife
 Manouk van der Meulen - Sofie, the Colonel's daughter
 Henk Reijn - Adjudant
 Hans Leendertse - Mayor
 Tetske van Ossewaarde - The Mayor's wife
 Ischa Meijer - Police commissioner
 Hannah de Leeuwe - Police commissioner's wife
 Frans Mulder - Municipal clerk
 Maeve van der Steen - Municipal clerk's wife
 Connie Breukhoven - Mercedes
 Corrie van Gorp - Madam Tilly
 Jérôme Reehuis - Napoleon
 Frans van Dusschoten - Field marshal
 Marjolein Sligte - Revue artist
 André Hazes - Restaurateur of the Inn
 Jon Bluming - Visitor of the Inn
 Manke Nelis - Singer
 Tonny Eyk - Accordion player
 Herbert Joeks - Dentist's patient
 Carol van Herwijnen - The Emperor's Inspector

External links 
 

Dutch comedy films
1982 films
1980s Dutch-language films